Vage Shakhverdyan (19 August 1945 – 31 October 2022) was an Armenian stage director and politician. An independent, he served in the National Assembly from 1995 to 1999.

Shakhverdyan died on 31 October 2022, at the age of 77.

References

1945 births
2022 deaths
20th-century Armenian politicians
Members of the National Assembly (Armenia)
Armenian theatre directors
Armenian theatre people
People from Vanadzor